Gohs or GOHS may refer to:
 Rolf Gohs (born 1933), Swedish comic creator

Schools 
 GlenOak High School, Canton, Ohio, United States
 Glen Oaks High School, Baton Rouge, Louisiana, United States
 Great Oak High School, Blaine County, San Andreas, United States

See also 
 GOH (disambiguation)